Kosmos 24 ( meaning Cosmos 24) or Zenit-2 No.15 was a Soviet optical film-return reconnaissance satellite. It was a first generation, low resolution spacecraft.

A Vostok-2 rocket, serial number G15001-03, was used to launch Kosmos 24. The launch took place at 09:28:58 UTC on 19 December 1963, from Site 1/5 at the Baikonur Cosmodrome. Following its successful arrival in orbit the spacecraft received its Kosmos designation, along with the International Designator 1963-052A and the Satellite Catalog Number 00712.

Kosmos 24 was operated in a low Earth orbit. Having spent nine days in orbit, the spacecraft was deorbited on 28 December 1963. Its return capsule descended under parachute for recovery by Soviet forces.

References

Spacecraft launched in 1963
Kosmos satellites
Spacecraft which reentered in 1963
Zenit-2 satellites